The British Transport Commission, later British Railways, used engine power output to categorise its requirements for the new main line diesel locomotive fleet following the 1955 modernisation plan.  The locomotives built and put into service are listed below classified with the TOPS class numbers that were introduced in the early 1970s.

Type 1
Locomotives classed as Type 1 were of 1,000 bhp or below.
Class 14
Class 15
Class 16
Class 17
Class 20
Certain members of Class 21
Certain members of Class 22

Type 2
Locomotives classed as Type 2 produced between 1,001 bhp and 1,499 bhp.
Certain members of Class 21
Certain members of Class 22
Class 23
Class 24
Class 25
Class 26
Class 27
Class 28
Class 29
Class 30/31

Type 3
Locomotives classed as Type 3 produced between 1,500 bhp and 1,999 bhp.
Class 33/34
Class 35
Class 37

Type 4
Locomotives classed as Type 4 produced between 2,000 bhp and 2,999 bhp.
Class 40
Class 41
Class 42
Class 43 (Warship)
Class 43 (HST)
Class 44
Class 45
Class 46
Class 47
Class 48
Class 50
Class 52
Class 53
Class 57
D0260 Lion (prototype)
DP2 (prototype)

Type 5
Locomotives classed as Type 5 produced 3,000 bhp or more.
Class 55
Class 56
Class 58
Class 59
Class 60
Class 66
Class 67
Class 68
Class 70

References
List of types

British Rail Power Classifications